The Fire of Awakening is the seventh full-length studio album by Polish black metal band Graveland. It was released in 2003 on No Colours Records and was limited to 1000 copies.

Track listing
 "We Shall Prevail" - 9:53
 "Battle of Wotan's Wolves" - 8:40
 "In the Sea of Blood" - 7:29
 "Die for Freedom" - 10:45
 "The Four Wings of the Sun" - 10:48

Personnel

Additional personnel
 Christophe Szpajdel - logo

2003 albums
Graveland albums